Velpen is an unincorporated community in southeastern Marion Township, Pike County, in the U.S. state of Indiana. It lies along State Road 257 southeast of the city of Petersburg, the county seat of Pike County. Although Velpen is unincorporated, it has a post office, with the ZIP code of 47590.

History
A post office has been in operation at Velpen since 1881. The community may be named after the Velp river in Europe.

Geography

References

Unincorporated communities in Pike County, Indiana
Unincorporated communities in Indiana
Jasper, Indiana micropolitan area